The American Academy of Art College is a private art school in Chicago, Illinois. It was founded in 1923 for the education of fine and commercial arts students.

The school's Bill L. Parks Gallery is open to the public and features exhibitions of works by students, faculty, visiting arts and works from the academy's permanent collection.

History
The American Academy of Art was founded in 1923 by Frank Young and Harry L. Timmins to train students for careers in commercial and fine art.

Academics
Enrollment is typically between 400 and 500 students. Eight areas of study are offered for a Bachelor of Fine Arts degree, all of which require 126 credit hours to graduate. The academy is accredited by the Higher Learning Commission.

Notable alumni
Kanye West
Thomas Blackshear
Bruce Burns
Sandy Dvore
Gil Elvgren
Loren Long
Rupert Kinnard
Alex Ross
Richard Schmid
Richard Sloan (artist)
Haddon Sundblom
Jill Thompson
John Tobias
Joyce Ballantyne
David Eugene Herbert (artist & tv kids show host)

References

External links

Art schools in Illinois
Educational institutions established in 1923
Universities and colleges in Chicago
1923 establishments in Illinois
Art museums and galleries in Chicago
Private universities and colleges in Illinois